The 2019 Gold Cup — officially known as the SSG Gold Cup, presented by Blu Approved and M4Jam for sponsorship reasons — was the 2019 edition of the Gold Cup, an annual rugby union competition held in South Africa between the top non-university club teams of the South African Rugby Union's constituent provincial unions. The competition was the third edition of the competition since its name change in 2016 and the sixth edition since it was launched as the Community Cup in 2013.

SARU restored the competition to the early-year time-slot it occupied from 2013 to 2015 — which resulted the competition taking a hiatus in 2018 – and was scheduled for 9 March to 14 April 2019. In an additional change from the 2017 edition, the amount of participating teams were reduced from 20 to 16, with one spot going to each of the fourteen provincial unions, one spot to the  sub-union and the final spot went to a wildcard entry.

Competition rules and information

There were sixteen participating teams in the 2019 Gold Cup, divided into four pools of four teams. Each team played all the other teams in their pool during the pool stage, either at home or away. Teams received four log points for a win and two log points for a draw. Bonus log points were awarded to teams that scored four or more tries in a game, as well as to teams that lost a match by seven points or less. Teams were ranked by log points, then points difference (points scored less points conceded).

The top two teams in each pool after the pool stage qualified for the quarterfinals. The quarterfinal winners qualified to the semifinals, and the semifinal winners to the final.

Teams

The teams that qualified for the 2019 Gold Cup were confirmed by SARU on 14 November 2018. In addition to the fifteen teams that qualified from each provincial union, East Rand United were included as a wildcard team. The participating teams are:

Pool stage

Pool A

Log

Matches

Pool B

Log

Matches

Pool C

Log

Matches

Pool D

Log

Matches

Play-offs

Quarterfinals

Semifinals

Final

Squads

The following squads were named for the 2019 Gold Cup:

References

2019
2019 in South African rugby union
2019 rugby union tournaments for clubs